West Kensington is an area of London, England

West Kensington  may also refer to:

West Kensington, Philadelphia, Pennsylvania
West Kensington tube station